Alexander Kennedy Smith  (7 July 1824 – 16 January 1881) was a Scottish/Australian engineer and former Mayor of Melbourne.

Early life
Smith was born in Cauldmill near Hawick, Roxburghshire, Scotland.  He was involved in the development of many of Victoria's gas and water works during the 1850s and 1860s.

Smith was sent from Scotland to Melbourne in 1854 to manage and build the Melbourne Gas and Coke Co. works. Once that project was complete, Smith remained in Victoria and set up his own practice. He built gas works at Ballarat, Castlemaine and Bendigo in Victoria, as well as one at Newcastle, New South Wales. Smith also drew up plans and specifications for many other works in Australia and overseas. He was a consulting and locomotive engineer for the Melbourne and Suburban Railway Company, and worked as an engineer on the South Yarra Waterworks.

Smith was also a member of the Victorian Legislative Assembly from 1877 to 1881, member for the La Trobe Ward in the Melbourne City Council for fifteen years, and Mayor of Melbourne from 1875 to 1876.

Smith died of heart disease at his home in Studley Park, Victoria, Australia.

Career highlights
1846–1854 Engineer with the Great Western Railway Company.
1853 – c.1857 Seconded to build and manage the Melbourne Gas and Coke Co. works – a five-year contract
1854 Arrived in Australia (Melbourne)
c.1857 –  Civil and Consulting Engineer private practice established in Carlton, Victoria
1860 – ? Major in the Victorian Volunteer Artillery Regiment
1875–1876 Mayor of the City of Melbourne
1877–1881 Member for East Melbourne in the Legislative Assembly

References
Bio at Melbourne University Bright Sparcs
Jill Eastwood, 'Smith, Alexander Kennedy (1824–1881)', Australian Dictionary of Biography, Vol.6, MUP, 1976, p. 139

1824 births
1881 deaths
People from the Scottish Borders
Australian engineers
Scottish civil engineers
Mayors and Lord Mayors of Melbourne
Victoria (Australia) state politicians
Engineers from Melbourne
Scottish emigrants to Australia
19th-century Australian politicians